Oktobar 1864 is the first studio album by the Serbian and former Yugoslav rock band Oktobar 1864, released in 1987. The album producer was Saša Habić.

Track listing

Personnel 
 Tanja Jovićević - vocals
 Goran Tomanović - guitar
 Dean Krmpotić - keyboards
 Željko Mitrović - bass
 Ivan Zečević - drums
 Marko Lalić - saxophone
 Nebojša Mrvaljević - trombone
 Branko Baćović - trumpet

Guests
 Saša Habić - keyboards
 Bojan Zulfikarpašić - keyboards
 Jova Maljoković - saxophone
 Ljuba Ninković - backing vocalist  
 Asim Sarvan - backing vocalist

External links

Oktobar 1864 albums
1987 debut albums
Jugodisk albums
Serbian-language albums